The Pegas Arcus is a Czech single-place paraglider that was designed and produced by Pegas 2000 of Prague. It is now out of production.

Design and development
The aircraft was designed as a beginner/intermediate glider. The models are each named for their approximate wing area in square metres.

Variants
Arcus 1 24
Small-sized model for lighter pilots.
Arcus 1 26
Mid-sized model for medium-weight pilots. The glider model is Swiss SHV Standard certified.
Arcus 1 30
Large-sized model for heavier pilots.

Specifications (Arcus 1 26)

References

Arcus
Paragliders